Jo Deuk-jun (1915 – 1958) was a South Korean basketball player. He competed in the men's tournament at the 1948 Summer Olympics.

References

1915 births
1958 deaths
South Korean men's basketball players
Olympic basketball players of South Korea
Basketball players at the 1948 Summer Olympics
Place of birth missing